Gurney Myatt Snider (born December 30, 1994) is an American professional stock car racing driver. He is the son of NASCAR on NBC pit reporter Marty Snider. He competes part-time in the NASCAR Xfinity Series, driving the No. 19 Toyota Supra for Joe Gibbs Racing.

Racing career

ARCA Menards Series
Driving the No. 22 Cunningham Motorsports car on a part-time basis, Snider won his first start in the ARCA Racing Series, leading 35 laps en route to victory at Toledo Speedway in 2016. He also captured the pole at Michigan International Speedway and recorded two other top-five finishes in nine starts. In 2019, Snider joined with Venturini Motorsports for a one-off deal at Michigan.

Truck Series
Snider made his NASCAR national series debut in 2016, driving the No. 22 truck for AM Racing. He started 19th and finished on the lead lap in 17th. On December 23, 2016, it was announced that Snider would pilot the No. 51 Kyle Busch Motorsports truck for eight races in the 2017 season, including the season-opening NextEra Energy Resources 250 at Daytona International Speedway. Snider moved to ThorSport Racing to drive the team's No. 13 truck to drive full-time in 2018, replacing Cody Coughlin. He finished ninth in points and won Truck Series Rookie of the Year.

In 2019, Snider moved to ThorSport's No. 27 to drive part-time that year. Later in the season, he replaced Johnny Sauter in the team's No. 13 for the CarShield 200 at World Wide Technology Raceway at Gateway after Sauter was suspended.

Snider returned to the Truck Series in March 2021 for the Bristol Motor Speedway dirt race, driving the No. 33 for Reaume Brothers Racing.

Whelen Euro Series
On April 9, 2019, Snider announced he would compete full-time in the NASCAR Whelen Euro Series Elite 2 Division, driving the No. 48 Ford Mustang for Racing Engineering. Snider was originally spurred on by a chance to join fellow American Bobby Labonte's team, but that initial opportunity did not work out.

Xfinity Series

On November 21, 2019, it was announced that Snider would drive select races for Richard Childress Racing in the NASCAR Xfinity Series in 2020, starting with the season opener at Daytona. His 2020 schedule was increased to 20 races in January when he joined RSS Racing on a limited basis.

In his series debut at Daytona, he won the pole and led 23 laps in the opening stage, but was involved in a crash shortly before the end of the second stage. After running the first eight races, Snider committed to a full-time 2020 schedule, contesting all but three races for RSS; he ran the Pocono Raceway, Martinsville Speedway, and Phoenix Raceway rounds with RCR.

Snider joined RCR's No. 2 for the full 2021 season. He would earn his first Xfinity Series win at Homestead-Miami Speedway on February 27, holding off RCR Cup driver and two-time champion Tyler Reddick in an overtime finish. The win qualified Snider for the playoffs. In the Round of 12's final race at the Charlotte Motor Speedway Roval, Snider was penalized for changing lanes too soon on a restart; although he rebounded to finish eighth, it was not enough to advance him to the next round and he was eliminated.

Sheldon Creed was announced as the No. 2's driver for the 2022 season, though RCR and General Motors intended to keep Snider within their driver development program. On November 3, Jordan Anderson Racing signed Snider to drive the No. 31. On the last lap of the season opening 2022 Beef. It's What's for Dinner. 300, Snider was involved in a wild accident. He got turned by the 23 of Anthony Alfredo. His car went airborne and hit the backstretch catchfence, destroying the car. He was seen moving around in the car and managed to get out and walk under his own power. He DNFed in 22nd place as a result. He finished second at Portland, becoming his highest finish of the season. At Martinsville, Snider collided with Austin Hill during the closing laps. Following the race, Hill punched Snider in the face on pit road.

On February 8, 2023, it was announced that Snider will drive for Joe Gibbs Racing in select races for the 2023 season, starting with the season-opener at Daytona.

Other racing
In March 2019, Snider competed in the Michelin Pilot Challenge sports car race at Sebring International Raceway, driving a Ford for Multimatic Motorsports alongside ThorSport Racing teammates Matt Crafton, Grant Enfinger, and Ben Rhodes.

Personal life
Myatt is the son of NASCAR on NBC pit reporter Marty Snider. He attends UNC Charlotte, and intends to gain a pilot's license down the road.

Motorsports career results

NASCAR
(key) (Bold – Pole position awarded by qualifying time. Italics – Pole position earned by points standings or practice time. * – Most laps led.)

Xfinity Series

Camping World Truck Series

 Season still in progress
 Ineligible for series points

Whelen Euro Series – Elite 2

ARCA Menards Series
(key) (Bold – Pole position awarded by qualifying time. Italics – Pole position earned by points standings or practice time. * – Most laps led.)

References

External links
 

Living people
1994 births
NASCAR drivers
ARCA Menards Series drivers
Racing drivers from Charlotte, North Carolina
Richard Childress Racing drivers
Racing Engineering drivers
Multimatic Motorsports drivers
Kyle Busch Motorsports drivers
Michelin Pilot Challenge drivers
Joe Gibbs Racing drivers